François Gravel (born October 4, 1951) is a Canadian writer from Quebec. Most noted as an author of literature for children and young adults, he has also published a number of adult novels.

An economics graduate of the Université du Québec à Montréal, Gravel taught economics at Cégep Saint-Jean-sur-Richelieu until 2006. He is the partner of writer Michèle Marineau and the father of writer and illustrator Élise Gravel.

His most recent adult novel, À vos ordres, colonel Parkinson!, was inspired by his own recent diagnosis with Parkinson's disease.

Many of his works have been translated into English by Sheila Fischman.

Awards
He won the Governor General's Award for French-language children's literature at the 1991 Governor General's Awards for Deux heures et demie avant Jasmine. He has been shortlisted for the award five other times: at the 1994 Governor General's Awards for Klonk, at the 2000 Governor General's Awards for L'été de la moustache, at the 2002 Governor General's Awards for David et la maison de la sorcière, at the 2008 Governor General's Awards for Sales crapauds and at the 2012 Governor General's Awards for Hò.

Fischman has received three nominations for the Governor General's Award for French to English translation for her translations of Gravel's work at the 1990 Governor General's Awards for Benito, the 1992 Governor General's Awards for Felicity's Fool (Bonheur fou) and the 1996 Governor General's Awards for Ostende.

Gravel won the French Mr. Christie's Book Award in 1991 for Zamboni, and in 2001 for David et le fantôme in conjunction with illustrator Pierre Pratt. Gravel and Pratt won the French TD Canadian Children's Literature Award in 2006 for David et le salon funéraire.

His adult novel Adieu, Betty Crocker was a competing title in the 2014 edition of Le Combat des livres, where it was defended by actress Pauline Martin.

Works

Novels 
 La Note de passage, 1985
 Benito, 1987
 Effet Summerhill, 1988
 Bonheur fou, 1989 
 Les Black Stones vous reviendront dans quelques instants, 1991
 Ostende, 1994
 Miss Septembre, 1996 
 Vingt et un tableaux (et quelques craies), 1998
 Fillion et frères, 2000
 Je ne comprends pas tout, 2002
 Adieu, Betty Crocker, 2003
 Mélamine Blues, 2005
 Vous êtes ici, 2007
 Voyeurs, s'abstenir, 2009
 À deux pas de chez elle: La première enquête de Chloé Perreault, 2011
 Toute une vie sur les bancs d’école, 2016
 Idées noires, 2017
 La petite fille en haut de l’escalier, 2018
 À vos ordres, colonel Parkinson!, 2019

Children's and young adult literature

Klonk series 
Klonk, 1993
Lance et Klonk, 1994
Le Cercueil de Klonk, 1995
Un amour de Klonk, 1995
Le Cauchemar de Klonk, 1997
Klonk et le Beatle mouillé, 1997
Klonk et le Treize noir, 1999
Klonk et la Queue du scorpion, 2000
Coca-Klonk, 2001
La Racine carrée de Klonk, 2002
Le Testament de Klonk, 2003
Klonk contre Klonk, 2004

David series
David et le Fantôme, 2000
David et le Précipice, 2001
David et les Monstres de la forêt, 2001
David et la Maison de la sorcière, 2002
David et l'Orage, 2003
David et les Crabes noirs, 2004
David et le Salon funéraire, 2005
David et la Bête, 2007
David et Léa, 2008

Other 
 Corneilles, 1989
 Zamboni, 1990
 Deux heures et demie avant Jasmine, 1991
 Granulite, 1992
 Guillaume, 1995
 Le Match des étoiles, 1996
 Kate, quelque part
 L'Été de la moustache, 2000
 La Piste sauvage, 2002
 L'Araignée sauvage, 2004
 Sekhmet, la déesse sauvage, 2005
 Sacrilège, 2006
 Les Horloges de M. Svonok, 2007
 Sales Crapauds, 2007
La Cagoule, 2008
 Sauvage, 2010
 Du soccer extrême !, 2010
 Ça, c'est du baseball, 2010
 Ok pour le hockey !, 2011
 Il pleut des records, 2011
 Silence, on zappe !, 2012
 Schlick, 2012
 Hò, 2012
 À nous deux, Barbe-Mauve !, 2012
 Hollywood, nous voici, 2013

References

1951 births
21st-century Canadian novelists
21st-century Canadian male writers
Canadian male novelists
Canadian novelists in French
Governor General's Award-winning children's writers
Canadian writers of young adult literature
Writers from Montreal
French Quebecers
Living people
Canadian children's writers in French